The Afghan (originally titled Moonlight) is a 2002 Dutch thriller film directed by Paula van der Oest. It was entered into the 25th Moscow International Film Festival.

Cast
 Hunter Bussemaker as Boy
 Franck Sasonoff as Escort
 Andrew Howard as Gang Leader
 David Bustard as Gang Member 1
 Elvir Sabanovic as Gang Member 2
 Laurien Van den Broeck as Claire
 Johan Leysen as Father
 Stephen Tate as Patient
 Jemma Redgrave as Mother
 Sarah Markianidis as Girl Student
 Emma Drews as Daphne
 Valerie Scott as Teacher

References

External links
 

2002 films
2002 thriller films
Dutch thriller films
English-language Dutch films
2000s English-language films